Ghatal Lok Sabha constituency is one of the 543 parliamentary constituencies in India. The constituency is based on Ghatal in West Bengal. While six assembly segments of No. 32 Ghatal Lok Sabha constituency are in Paschim Medinipur district, one segment is in Purba Medinipur district.

As per order of the Delimitation Commission in respect of the delimitation of constituencies in the West Bengal, Panskura Lok Sabha constituency ceased to exist; and a new Ghatal Lok Sabha constituency came into being. The Ghatal constituency existed earlier from 1951 to 1977

Assembly segments

Ghatal Lok Sabha constituency (parliamentary constituency no. 32) is composed of the following assembly segments:

Members of Parliament

For Members of Parliament from the area during the period 1977-2009 see Panskura Lok Sabha constituency

Election results

17th Lok Sabha: 2019 General Elections

General election 2014

General election 2009

For Members of Parliament from the area during the period 1977-2009 see Panskura Lok Sabha constituency

General election 1971

General election 1967

General election 1962

General election 1957

General election 1952

General elections 1951-1971
Most of the contests were multi-cornered. However, only winners and runners-up are mentioned below:

See also
 List of constituencies of the Lok Sabha

References

External links
Ghatal lok sabha  constituency election 2019 result details

Lok Sabha constituencies in West Bengal
Politics of Paschim Medinipur district